Gaius Albucius Silus was an ancient Roman orator and teacher of rhetoric under emperor Augustus. He was born and died in Novaria (today Novara), but made his career in Rome. Suetonius gives a sketch of his life, while Seneca the Elder describes him as an outstanding declaimer.

In the novel Albucius (1990), Pascal Quignard invents fifty-three controversiae (fictitious lawsuits) by Albucius and alternates them with historical and fictional scenes from his life.

References

Primary sources 
Suetonius on Albucius Silus (in English)
Introduction to the 7th book of Seneca's Controversiae (in Latin)

1st-century BC Romans
1st-century Romans
Ancient Roman rhetoricians
Albucii